Elizabeth Scott (born 1972) is an American author of young adult novels.

Life
Born in a small town, Scott grew up near Hopewell in Southern Virginia. Both of her parents were teachers, which she ended up taking classes from both of them. She majored in European Studies and met her future husband in her freshman year. Along with writing novels Elizabeth Scott has also been an editor and an office manager. She has also sold hardware and pantyhose.

Bibliography

Novels
 Bloom, (2007), Simon Pulse, 
 Perfect You, (2008), Simon Pulse, 
 Stealing Heaven, (2008), HarperTeen, 
 Living Dead Girl, (2008), Simon Pulse, 
 Something, Maybe, (2009), Simon Pulse, 
 Love You Hate You Miss You, (2009), Simon Pulse, 
 The Unwritten Rule, (2010), Simon Pulse, 
 Grace, (2010), Dutton Books, 
 Between Here and Forever, (2011), Simon Pulse, 
 As I Wake, (2011), Dutton Books, 
 Miracle, (2012), Simon Pulse, 
 Heartbeat, (2014), Harlequin Teen,

References

External links
Official website (archived version)
Elizabeth Scott's Blog
Interview in Teen Troves
Interview in Pop Gurls
Interview in Teen Book Review
Review of Bloom in Trashonista
Interview in Pop Gurls about Living Dead Girl

21st-century American novelists
American women novelists
American writers of young adult literature
Novelists from Virginia
Living people
1972 births
21st-century American women writers
Women writers of young adult literature